Trident House is a residential building in the city of Birmingham, England, with a height of 61 metres (200 feet). It comprises 19 floors and was completed in 1981.

External links

Residential buildings completed in 1981
Buildings and structures in Birmingham, West Midlands